Baguio Cemetery (also known as the Baguio Public Cemetery) is a  cemetery in the city of Baguio, Philippines, on top of a hill along Naguilian Road.

Established in the 1950s, the cemetery was overcrowded by 2011. Informal settlers, some working in the cemetery as tomb cleaners and painters, have settled in land allotted to the cemetery by the Baguio city government.

See also
 List of cemeteries in the Philippines

References

External links
 
 Coordinates from 

Cemeteries in the Philippines
Buildings and structures in Baguio